Larisa Savchenko-Neiland and Natasha Zvereva were the two-time defending champions and successfully defended their title by defeating Lise Gregory and Gretchen Magers, 3–6, 6–3, 6–3.

Seeds
Champion seeds are indicated in bold text while text in italics indicates the round in which those seeds were eliminated. The top four seeded teams received byes into the second round.

Draw

Finals

Top half

Bottom half

External links
 1990 Dow Classic Draws

Birmingham Classic (tennis)
1990 WTA Tour